Rawa or Rawah is an Iraqi city on the Euphrates river. It lies on the north bank of the river, upstream by approx. 20 kilometers (12.5 mi) from the much larger town of Anah. People from this town are known by the appellation Rawi or surname al-Rawi, plurally known as Rawiyeen in Arabic.

History

Iraqi Civil War 

The New York Times reported in 2014 that the Islamic State in Iraq and the Levant or ISIL (also known as ISIS) controlled the town. The Iraqi offensive to recapture the city was launched on 11 November 2017, as part of the Western Iraq campaign. Iraqi forces captured Rawa on 17 November 2017.

Twin town
Rawa is twinned with:

  Towamencin Township, Montgomery County, Pennsylvania, United States

See also 
List of cities and towns on the Euphrates River

References

External links 

Populated places in Al Anbar Governorate
Populated places on the Euphrates River